Hamlet is a 1913 British silent drama film directed by Hay Plumb and starring Johnston Forbes-Robertson, Gertrude Elliott and Walter Ringham. It is an adaptation of the play Hamlet by William Shakespeare made by the Hepworth Company and based on the Drury Lane Theatre's 1913 staging of the work.

Cast
 Johnston Forbes-Robertson - Hamlet
 Gertrude Elliott - Ophelia
 Walter Ringham - Claudius
 Adeleine Bourne - Gertrude
 J.H. Barnes - Polonius
 S.A. Cookson - Horatio
 Alex Scott-Gatty - Laertes
 Grendon Bentley - Fortinbras
 Montagu Rutherford - Priest
 J.H. Ryley - A Gravedigger
 Percy Rhodes - The Ghost
 Robert Atkins - Marcellus
 Eric Adeney - Reynaldo
 Richard Andean - Second Player
 George Hayes - Osric
 S.T. Pearce - Second Gravedigger
 Olive Richardson - Player Queen
 E.A. Ross - Guildenstern

See also
List of ghost films

References

External links

 Program poster for a screening of the film

1913 films
1910s historical drama films
Films directed by Hay Plumb
Films based on Hamlet
British silent feature films
British historical drama films
Hepworth Pictures films
British black-and-white films
1913 drama films
1910s English-language films
1910s British films
Silent drama films